Liz Jackson  (1951 – 27 June 2018) was an Australian journalist and barrister noted for her work on the Four Corners and  Media Watch television programs. She received nine Walkley Awards for excellence in journalism.

Career 
Jackson grew up in Melbourne, Australia and commenced work with the Australian Broadcasting Corporation (ABC) in 1986. Prior to her career with the ABC, Jackson also worked in a community legal centre in Australia and practised law in London as a barrister at Gray's Inn. Jackson returned to Australia and worked for the NSW Premier's Department, in the Women's Coordination Unit, dealing with laws to protect women from violence.

After joining Four Corners as an investigative reporter in 1994, Jackson was awarded Walkley Awards, Australia's awards for journalism, on five occasions for her work on the following:
The situation in Somalia (1993);
The suicide of Aboriginal activist Rob Riley;
"Fixing Cricket", a report about cricket match-fixing (2000);
"Go to jail", regarding the Northern Territory's mandatory sentencing laws (2000); and,
"Putting the Children at Risk", an investigation into the New South Wales Government Department of Community Services (2002).

Jackson received three Logie Awards for "Fixing Cricket" and stories related to the Blackhawk disaster and HIV transmission from a doctor's surgery.

At the start of 2005, Jackson hosted the media-criticism program Media Watch, before stepping down in December 2005 and returning to Four Corners.

Personal life 
In November 2016, Jackson revealed she had been diagnosed with Parkinson's disease in 2014, with the release of a documentary called "A Sense of Self" broadcast as an episode of Four Corners.

She died in her sleep while on holiday in Greece on 27 June 2018, at the age of 67.

Her daughter, Rose Jackson, is a Labor member of the New South Wales Legislative Council.

References

1951 births
2018 deaths
Australian television journalists
Australian television presenters
Australian women television presenters
Australian women journalists
Walkley Award winners
Journalists from Melbourne
Australian barristers
Members of Gray's Inn
People with Parkinson's disease